Rashtriya Swayamsevak Sangh (RSS) is an Indian right-wing, Hindu nationalist , volunteer organisation which is widely regarded as ideological parent organisation of the ruling party of India, the Bharatiya Janata Party. The RSS is one of the principal organizations of the Sangh Parivar group. RSS is the ideological parent of BJP. But BJP is not a political arm of RSS .Founded on Vijaya Dashami day in 1925, it claimed a commitment to selfless service to India. The BJP traces its roots to the Bharatiya Jana Sangh (BJS; Indian People’s Association), which was established in 1951 as the political wing of the pro-Hindu group Rashtriya Swayamsevak Sangh (RSS; “National Volunteers Corps”) by Shyama Prasad Mukherjee. organisation is one of the world's largest voluntary organization.Organisation inspired institutions and movements today form a strong presence in social, cultural, educational, labour, developmental, political and other fields of nationalist endeavour .

Political leaders

Bharatiya Janata Party politicians 
 Atal Bihari Vajpayee — 7th Prime Minister of India (1998–2005)
 L. K. Advani — Deputy Prime Minister of India (2002–2004)
 Murli Manohar Joshi — Member of Parliament, Lok Sabha, Member of Parliament, Rajya Sabha
 Narendra Modi —  14th Prime Minister of India (2014–present)
 Rajnath Singh — Minister of Defence (2019–present)
 Ram Nath Kovind — 14th President of India (2017–present)
 Venkaiah Naidu —  13th Vice President of India (2017–present)
 Nitin Gadkari — Minister of Road Transport and Highways (2014–present)
 Manohar Parrikar — 10th Chief Minister of Goa (2000–2005)
 Amit Shah — 31st Home Minister of India (2019–present)
 Vijay Rupani — 16th Chief Minister of Gujarat (2016–2021)
 Devendra Fadnavis — 18th Chief Minister of Maharashtra (2014–2019)
 Shankersinh Vaghela — 12th Chief Minister of Gujarat (1996–1997)
 Keshubhai Patel — 10th Chief Minister of Gujarat (1995; 1998–2001)
 Pramod Mahajan — former Minister of Communications and Information Technology from 2001–2003
 Gopinath Munde — former Member of Parliament, Lok Sabha from 2009–2014
 Biplab Kumar Deb — 10th Chief Minister of Tripura (2018–present)
 Manoharlal Khattar — 10th Chief Minister of Haryana (2014–present)
 Dilip Ghosh — Member of Parliament, Lok Sabha (2019–present)
B. S. Yediyurappa - 19th Chief Minister of Karnataka (2019- 2021)
B. L. Santhosh National General Secretary of Bharatiya Janata Party

 Ram Madhav — National General Secretary of the Bharatiya Janata Party (2014–present).
Jai Ram Thakur - Chief Minister of Himachal Pradesh (2017-present)
Suresh Bhardwaj - Cabinet Minister of Himachal Pradesh (2017-present)
Naresh Bansal —  Member of Parliament, Rajya Sabha
Kirit Parmar - Mayor of Ahmedabad

Other party leaders 
 Deendayal Upadhyaya— former president of Bharatiya Jana Sangh from 1967–1968.

See also
 List of Sarsanghchalaks of the Rashtriya Swayamsevak Sangh

References

Rashtriya Swayamsevak Sangh